In the mathematical discipline of descriptive set theory, a scale is a certain kind of object defined on a set of points in some Polish space (for example, a scale might be defined on a set of real numbers).  Scales were originally isolated as a concept in the theory of uniformization, but have found wide applicability in descriptive set theory, with applications such as establishing bounds on the possible lengths of wellorderings of a given complexity, and showing (under certain assumptions) that there are largest countable sets of certain complexities.

Formal definition
Given a pointset A contained in some product space

where each Xk is either the Baire space or a countably infinite discrete set, we say that a norm on A is a map from A into the ordinal numbers.  Each norm has an associated prewellordering, where one element of A precedes another element if the norm of the first is less than the norm of the second.

A scale on A is a countably infinite collection of norms

with the following properties:
 If the sequence xi is such that
 xi is an element of A for each natural number i, and
 xi converges to an element x in the product space X, and 
 for each natural number n there is an ordinal λn such that φn(xi)=λn for all sufficiently large i, then
x is an element of A, and
for each n, φn(x)≤λn.
By itself, at least granted the axiom of choice, the existence of a scale on a pointset is trivial, as A can be wellordered and each φn can simply enumerate A.  To make the concept useful, a definability criterion must be imposed on the norms (individually and together).  Here "definability" is understood in the usual sense of descriptive set theory; it need not be definability in an absolute sense, but rather indicates membership in some pointclass of sets of reals.  The norms φn themselves are not sets of reals, but the corresponding prewellorderings are (at least in essence).

The idea is that, for a given pointclass Γ, we want the prewellorderings below a given point in A to be uniformly represented both as a set in Γ and as one in the dual pointclass of Γ, relative to the "larger" point being an element of A.  Formally, we say that the φn form a Γ-scale on A if they form a scale on A and there are ternary relations S and T such that, if y is an element of A, then

where S is in Γ and T is in the dual pointclass of Γ (that is, the complement of T is in Γ).  Note here that we think of φn(x) as being ∞ whenever x∉A; thus the condition φn(x)≤φn(y), for y∈A, also implies x∈A.

The definition does not imply that the collection of norms is in the intersection of Γ with the dual pointclass of Γ.  This is because the three-way equivalence is conditional on y being an element of A.  For y not in A, it might be the case that one or both of S(n,x,y) or T(n,x,y) fail to hold, even if x is in A (and therefore automatically φn(x)≤φn(y)=∞).

Applications

Scale property
The scale property is a strengthening of the prewellordering property.  For pointclasses of a certain form, it implies that relations in the given pointclass have a uniformization that is also in the pointclass.

Periodicity

Notes

References
 
 

Descriptive set theory